Pizza Man is a 1991 comedy film starring Bill Maher and Annabelle Gurwitch; written and directed by J.F. Lawton, who was credited as J.D. Athens. The film received a PG-13 rating by the MPAA.

Plot
Elmo Bunn is an L.A. pizza delivery man with a reputation for never having delivered a cold pizza or being stiffed on a bill. When a call comes into his shop for an extra-large with sausage and anchovies to go to a dangerous part of East Hollywood, Elmo knows he's in for trouble.

Credited cast
Bill Maher as Elmo Bunn
Annabelle Gurwitch	as The Dame
David McKnight as Vance
Bob Delegall as Mayor Bradley
Bryan Clark as Ronald Reagan
Arlene Banas as Marilyn Quayle
Ron Darian as Michael Dukakis
Jeff Hawk as Dan Quayle
Jim Jackman as Mike Milken
Clyde Kusatsu as Former Prime Minister Nakasone
Francine Lee as Anan
John Moody	as Bob Woodward
Sam Pancake as The Kid
Simon Richards as Donald Trump
Andy Romano as The Hood
Cathy Shambley as Geraldine Ferraro

Critical reception
The Los Angeles Times wrote in a review of the film, "Lawton has a real winner in Maher, a hairy-chested macho guy with a great sense of humor, and with also the femme fatale of his plot, Annabelle Gurwitch, who has no trouble being glamorous and funny at the same time."

References

External links 
 
 

1991 comedy films
1991 films
American comedy films
Cultural depictions of Donald Trump
Cultural depictions of Ronald Reagan
1990s English-language films
1990s American films